The  San Antonio Talons season was the 13th season for the franchise, the fourth in the Arena Football League, and the second in San Antonio, Texas. The team was coached by Lee Johnson and played their home games at the Alamodome. Finishing the season with a 10–8 record, the Talons missed the playoffs by losing a tiebreaker with the Chicago Rush. They also finished the season with 9 different quarterbacks, 6 of them getting injured.

Final roster

Standings

Regular season schedule
The Talons began the season at home against the San Jose SaberCats on March 23. They closed the regular season at home against the Philadelphia Soul on July 27.

References

San Antonio Talons
San Antonio Talons seasons